Bhel or BHEL may refer to:
 Aegle marmelos, a fruit tree native to India
 Bhel puri, or bhelpuri, a type of chaat (snack food)
 Chinese bhel, an Indian noodle dish, and street food variant of the chop suey, popular in Mumbai, India
 Bharat Heavy Electricals Limited (BHEL), engineering and manufacturing enterprise in India